Bolter may refer to:

 Bolter (aeronautics), a term in naval aviation when a pilot misses the arrestor cable on an aircraft carrier and performs a go-around
 Bolter, a type of sieve

Arts and entertainment
 Bolter or Boltgun, a fictional automatic heavy caliber weapon firing "bolts" ammunition in the Warhammer 40,000 universe, with the term "bolter" primarily denote the assault rifle versions
 The Bolter, the narrator's mother in The Pursuit of Love by Nancy Mitford
 "The Bolter", an episode of Upstairs, Downstairs
 The Bolter, a 2008 biography by Frances Osborne about Idina Sackville

People with the surname
 Brian Bolter (fl. 1999–2013), American television news anchor and reporter
 Jay David Bolter (born 1951), American literary critic